HMAS Townsville (FCPB 205), named for the city of Townsville, Queensland, was a  of the Royal Australian Navy (RAN). Built by NQEA, Cairns, the ship was laid down in 1979, and commissioned into the RAN in 1981.

Assigned to the naval base , Townsville was primarily assigned to fisheries protection and border patrol operations in northern Australian waters. In December 1981, the patrol boat recaptured an escaping illegal fishing vessel. The next year, she was used for filming of the Patrol Boat television series. Townsville was deployed to Fiji as part of Operation Morris Dance in May 1987.

Townsville was decommissioned in May 2007. The ship was donated to the Townsville Maritime Museum for preservation. Attempts to put the ship on display stalled and the ship fell into disrepair, with the maritime museum acquired by Port of Townsville in 2015.

Design and construction

Main propulsion machinery consisted of two MTU series 538 diesel engines, which supplied  to the two propeller shafts. Exhaust was not expelled through a funnel, like most ships, but through vents below the waterline. The ship's company consisted of 22 personnel. Each patrol boat was armed with a single 40 mm Bofors gun as main armament, supplemented by two .50 cal Browning machineguns and an 81 mm mortar, although the mortar was removed from all ships sometime after 1988. The main weapon was originally to be two 30 mm guns on a twin-mount, but the reconditioned Bofors were selected to keep costs down; provision was made to install an updated weapon later in the class' service life, but this did not eventuate.

Townsville was laid down by NQEA, Cairns on 5 March 1979. She was launched on 16 May 1981 by the wife of Queensland Governor James Ramsay. The patrol boat has variously been nicknamed "The Black Knight Mustang 205" and "Wily Coyote" (the latter after the Looney Tunes character Wile E Coyote).

Operational history
Townsville, like all the Fremantle-class vessels, was primarily assigned to fisheries protection and border patrol operations in northern Australian waters. Tasks included boarding and inspection of ships operating in Australian waters, preventing unauthorised arrivals and illegal fishing, intercepting smugglers, and acting in support of Customs and law enforcement operations. Additionally, during the construction of the Fremantle class, Townsville was the designated buddy ship for vessels completing sea trials and initial working up.

On 25 December 1981, Townsville was called on to pursue the Taiwanese fishing vessel Yuan Tsun. The ship, which had been detained in Trinity Inlet after being caught illegally fishing in Australian waters, took the opportunity to escape while most military and law-enforcement personnel were on leave for the Christmas holiday. Townsville maintained pursuit of Yuan Tusn as the ship attempted to escape the Great Barrier Reef, fired several warning shots, and received approval from the Defence Minister to fire directly on the ship before the captain surrendered.

During 1982, Townsville was one of several Fremantles used to depict the fictional HMAS Defiance for filming of the second season of the ABC television series Patrol Boat.

Townsville was involved in Exercise Kangaroo 83.

In late May 1987, Townsville was deployed to Fiji as part of Operation Morris Dance, as relief for one of the patrol boats sent following the initial coup d'état earlier that month. The Australian government decided on 29 May that the situation had stabilised, with Townsville sailing for home that day.

On 1 June 1990, the patrol boat intercepted a vessel carrying Cambodian refugees off Bathurst Island. The vessel began sinking while the boarding and inspection was underway, with the personnel of Townsville rescuing 45 men, 17 women, and 17 children, and transporting them to Darwin. The following month, the patrol boat was in Nuku'Alofa for celebrations of the King of Tonga's birthday.

In January 1992, Townsville was used as the platform from which a team of clearance divers disposed of undetonated bombs found on Middleton Reef.

In July 1993, Townsville was used for water flow and cavitation experiments on the vessel's propellers. Two windows were inserted into the ship's hull above the propellers to allow filming of these effects.

During February 1994, Townsville visited several Papua New Guinean ports while conducting patrol operations in the Coral Sea.

In August 1995, Townsville participated in celebrations of the 50th anniversary of the end of World War II in the Pacific theatre.

From 24 to 28 May 1999, the patrol boat operated off Thursday Island as part of a sweep for illegal activity.

Decommissioning and fate
In 2007, Townsville was marked for disposal. On 23 April, the Australian Government announced Townsville had been donated to the Townsville Maritime Museum as a museum ship, along with $200,000 in funding to build a dry dock for display. Another $100,000 was promised by Townsville City Council. The two patrol boats were the last of the class in active service.

The vessel is fully operational (minus weaponry), and the museum intended to keep Townsville in a sailable condition, with maintenance undertaken by volunteers. In addition to being opened for public display, the Townsville Maritime Museum has also been contacted by cadet groups and emergency response organisations wanting to use the vessel for training. While waiting for approval to construct the dry dock adjacent to the museum site, Townsville was berthed at the Curtain Bros. wharf in Ross Creek.

As of January 2012, construction of the dry dock was scheduled to begin in mid-2012, pending council approval of building plans and the securing of additional funding. By March 2015, approval for the dock had not been granted: the museum blamed the delays on the Port of Townsville and other government authorities for not supporting the project and delaying approvals for a seabed site lease, while the Port of Townsville claimed that the museum had not put forward a viable business plan. In the interim, the condition of the patrol boat has deteriorated, with the museum unable to fund maintenance. There are concerns over the condition of Townsvilles hull, both from marine growth and from the lack of recent care resulting in the patrol boat resting on the rocky bottom at low tide.

Following meetings between the museum, the port authority, the council, and the regional development and tourism organisation, the Port of Townsville offered to take over the museum.

Citations

References

 The chapter is available separately as Semaphore, Issue 17, 2005 in PDF and HTML formats.

Fremantle-class patrol boats
Museum ships in Australia
Ships built in Queensland
HMAS
1981 ships